Abalone is a general purpose molecular dynamics and molecular graphics program for simulations of bio-molecules in a periodic boundary conditions in explicit (flexible SPC water model) or in implicit water models. Mainly designed to simulate the protein folding and DNA-ligand complexes in AMBER force field.

Key features
 3D molecular graphics
 Automatic Force Field generator for bioelements: H, C, N, O
 Building and editing chemical structures
 Library of building blocks
 Force fields: Assisted Model Building with Energy Refinement (AMBER) 94, 96, 99SB, 03; Optimized Potentials for Liquid Simulations (OPLS)
 Geometry optimizing
 Molecular dynamics with multiple time step integrator
 Hybrid Monte Carlo
 Replica exchange
 Interface with quantum chemistry - ORCA, NWChem, Firefly (PC GAMESS), CP2K
 GPU accelerated molecular modeling

See also

References

External links
 
 Benchmarking

Monte Carlo software
Computational chemistry software
Molecular dynamics software
Molecular modelling software
Science software